Kurt Deimer (kɜrt daɪ-mɜr) is an actor, musician, and Rock singer-songwriter from Cincinnati, OH. He is best known for his EP ‘Work Hard, Rock Hard’ that features Phil X (Bon Jovi) and Geoff Tate (Queensrÿche), produced by Chris Lord-Alge.

Career

Beginning in film 
Before entering into the entertainment business, Kurt Deimer was the owner of multiple startup companies, one of which was an oil brand called Starfire. In 2017, Deimer secured a visual feature for the brand signage in a movie later titled, “Trading Paint”. The film was being shot in Alabama, and Deimer was offered a cameo role. Upon his visit he was offered a speaking part in a scene opposite Toby Sebastian, John Travolta, and Shania Twain. A year later he was cast in a role opposite Michael Myers in the 2018 horror film, ‘Halloween’.

Music 
Prior to his entrance into the music industry, Deimer played in a college Rock band at University of Cincinnati. In 2018/2019, he added his vocals to demo songs a friend had written, which lead him to connect with both his now manager, Andy Gould (Rob Zombie and Linkin Park), as well as his now current band member Phil X. He began releasing music in 2021. In addition to featuring him on his single, “Burn Together”, Deimer was billed as direct support with Geoff Tate on tour after being connected by his management team. He has also directly supported Swedish guitarist Yngwie Malmsteen, the Rock band, Tesla, and Drowning Pool.

Work Hard, Rock Hard EP 
In November 2021, Kurt Deimer released his first EP titled, ‘Work Hard, Rock Hard’. He enlisted Chris Lord-Alge as a producer and worked with both Geoff Tate and Phil X on the album.

Personal and family life 
Deimer currently lives in Ohio and has three children.

Discography

Filmography

References 

Living people
American hard rock musicians
Halloween (franchise) characters
Rock songwriters
Year of birth missing (living people)